Year 7 is an educational year group in schools in many countries including England, Wales, Australia and New Zealand. It is the seventh full year (or eighth in Australia) of compulsory education and is roughly equivalent to grade 6 in the United States and Canada (or to grade 7 for the Australian Year 7).

New Zealand
In New Zealand, Year 7 is the seventh year of compulsory education. Children entering Year 7 are generally aged between 10½ and 12.
 Year 7 pupils are educated in full primary schools, intermediate schools, and in some areas area schools or combined intermediate and secondary schools.

United Kingdom

England and Wales
In schools in England and Wales, Year 7 is the seventh full year of compulsory education after Reception, with children being admitted who are aged 11 before 1 September in any given academic year. It is the first year group in Key Stage 3 in which the Secondary National Curriculum is taught and marks the beginning of secondary education. 

Year 7 follows Year 6, the last year of primary school education.

Year 7 is usually the first year of secondary school. In some areas of England, Year 7 is the first year of middle school.

Northern Ireland and Scotland 

In Northern Ireland and Scotland, the seventh year of compulsory education is called Primary 7, and pupils generally start at the age of 10–11.

References

7